Harrison was a rapid transit station on the Chicago "L" between 1926 and 1951 located on the Westchester branch.

History
The Westchester branch opened on October 1, 1926, with a station on Harrison Street. It continued in service until replaced by bus service on December 9, 1951.

Station details
The station was at ground level, with a Craftsman- and Prairie School-influenced station house with exterior stucco walling and an island platform.

Ridership
Throughout its existence, ridership statistics were collected at Harrison for only four years: 1933 and 1946–1948. In 1933, Harrison collected 5,160 passengers. For the last three years in which station-specific Westchester ridership statistics were collected, Harrison served a respective 21,375, 49,758, and 38,630 patrons. Its 1947 performance made it the third-least patronized of 222 "L" stations that were at least partially staffed of only Campbell and Randolph/Market on the Lake Street Elevated, while in 1948 it was the 215th-busiest of 223 such stations.

Notes

References

Works cited

Defunct Chicago "L" stations
1926 establishments in Illinois
1951 disestablishments in Illinois
Railway stations opened in 1926
Railway stations closed in 1951